Valjala-Ariste (Ariste until 2017) is a village in Saaremaa Parish, Saare County, Estonia, on the island of Saaremaa. As of 2011 Census, the settlement's population was 17.

Estonian poet and publicist Bernhard Viiding was born in the village.

References

Villages in Saare County